The 1985 Winston Western 500 was a NASCAR Winston Cup Series race that took place on November 17, 1985, at Riverside International Raceway in Riverside, California.

With the deletion of the two Nashville races the 1985 Winston Cup season was the first since 1974 with less than 30 races.

Race report
With one race remaining in the championship, Bill Elliott, who won 11 races, trailed Darrell Waltrip by 20 points (between 4-7 positions depending on the order of finish -- the equivalent of 4-7 points under the 2011 scoring system). Qualifying was held on Friday and Terry Labonte scored the pole with a time of 1:20.658.  

The 500-kilometer race, lasting 119 laps, would have the championship battle come down to the first six laps of the race. The gearshift lever on Elliott's car broke on the sixth lap, necessitating repairs that lasted thirty minutes, or roughly 22 laps of the race and putting him several laps down. Waltrip finished seventh and locked down the championship on Lap 99. On the day his teammate won the title Neil Bonnett ended 1985 on the podium as he lead a few laps and brought Junior Johnson's red #12 Budweiser Chevrolet home in third. The 1985 season would be one of career highs for Bonnett as he finished fourth in points on the strength of 11 top-5s and 18 top-10s. This would be the last season where Neil ran every race. This was a combination race with the Winston West series. They had four drivers (Jim Robinson, Hershel McGriff, Glen Steurer, and Ruben Garcia) eligible for the title. Robinson would clinch the title over McGriff with his 12th place finish.

Pit strategy determined the race. On the penultimate pit stop, Labonte's Billy Hagan pit crew changed two tires, while Ricky Rudd's Bud Moore Engineering Ford team changed four tires. On the final round of pit stops, the opposite took place, allowing Rudd to defeat Labonte by almost half a second in front of 40000 spectators. Ruben Garcia, later to gain fame from knocking out a wall in a crash during the last race at Riverside in 1988, scored his career-best finish of 14th place.

Three cautions slowed the race for 11 laps; allowing for 14 lead changes. Bobby Allison came into this race seeking to avoid going winless for the season for the first time since 1977. He qualified well but his chaotic season ended with a 17th-place, two laps down. This was the final race for Rusty Wallace competing for Cliff Stewart Racing.

Blair Aiken, Clark Dwyer, and John Soares, Jr would retire after the end of the race while Scott Autrey and Bud Hickey would make their only Winston Cup Series appearance at this event. Notable crew chiefs for this race included Junie Donlavey, Robin Pemberton, Joey Arrington, Jake Elder, Travis Carter, Bud Moore, Tim Brewer, Jeff Hammond, Harry Hyde, Kirk Shelmerdine and Darrell Bryant.

Qualifying

Top 20 finishers

Timeline
Section reference: 
 Start: Terry Labonte was leading the starting grid as the green flag was waved.
 Lap 10: Darrell Waltrip took over the lead from Terry Labonte.
 Lap 11: Terry Labonte took over the lead from Darrell Waltrip.
 Lap 19: First caution of the event, ended on lap 21.
 Lap 21: Ricky Rudd took over the lead from Terry Labonte.
 Lap 22: Dale Earnhardt took over the lead from Ricky Rudd.
 Lap 26: Terry Labonte took over the lead from Dale Earnhardt.
 Lap 41: Second caution of the event, ended on lap 44.
 Lap 42: Lake Speed took over the lead from Terry Labonte.
 Lap 43: Terry Labonte took over the lead from Lake Speed.
 Lap 48: Third caution of the event, ended on lap 50.
 Lap 71: Harry Gant took over the lead from Terry Labonte.
 Lap 72: Neil Bonnett took over the lead from Harry Gant.
 Lap 75: Ricky Rudd took over the lead from Neil Bonnett.
 Lap 77: Geoffrey Bodine took over the lead from Ricky Rudd.
 Lap 79: Dale Earnhardt took over the lead from Geoffrey Bodine.
 Lap 81: Terry Labonte took over the lead from Dale Earnhardt.
 Lap 96: Ricky Rudd took over the lead from Terry Labonte.
 Lap 116: Greg Sacks' vehicle suddenly developed issues with its transmission.
 Finish: Ricky Rudd was officially declared the winner of the race.

Standings after the race

References

Winston Western 500
Winston Western 500
NASCAR races at Riverside International Raceway